Jan Erlich (9 January 1947 – 3 June 1998) was a Polish footballer. He played in two matches for the Poland national football team in 1977.

References

External links
 
 

1947 births
1998 deaths
Polish footballers
Poland international footballers
Sportspeople from Gdynia
Association football midfielders
Arka Gdynia players
Legia Warsaw players
Zawisza Bydgoszcz players
Śląsk Wrocław players
Lechia Gdańsk players
Degerfors IF players
Polish expatriate footballers
Expatriate footballers in Sweden